HLLLYH (either Halleluyah or Hell Yeah) is the fourth and final studio album by Los Angeles-based experimental punk band The Mae Shi. It was released on February 11, 2008.
It is a concept album about Judeo-Christian religion, featuring mediations on stories of the Old Testament.


Track listing
 "Lamb and the Lion" - 2:24
 "PWND" - 2:48
 "Boys in the Attic" - 1:24
 "7 x x 7" - 2:02
 "The Melody" - 2:18
 "Leech and Locust" - 2:45
 "Run to Your Grave" - 3:53
 "Kingdom Come" - 11:37
 "I Get (Almost) Everything I Want" - 3:43
 "Party Politics" - 2:14
 "Young Marks" - 2:05
 "Book of Numbers" - 1:55
 "HLLLYH" - 4:56
 "Divine Harvest" - 2:14

Critical reception
HLLLYH received positive reviews, garnering a rating of 8.1 from independent music reviewer Pitchfork Media. Pitchfork also endorsed the album with an official recommendation and put it #18 on their staff list for the year.

References

The Mae Shi albums
2008 albums